HTL may refer to:

 Language technology
 HTL Buses, a bus company based in Merseyside, England
 Bell HTL a light helicopter
 Halifax Tool Library, a tool-lending library in Nova Scotia, Canada
 Heritage Trust of Lincolnshire, in England
 High tension line, used for electric power transmission
 Histology technologist
 High Threshold Logic, an electronic logic technology
 Höhere Technische Lehranstalt, engineering-focused secondary schools in Austria
 Hydrothermal liquefaction, a thermochemical depolymerisation process
 Roscommon County – Blodgett Memorial Airport, in Michigan, United States